I Agapi Argise mia Mera is a Greek television series that was aired by ERT/ΕΤ1 in season 1997-98. It was adapted from a novel by Lili Zografou. The series was directed by Kostas Koutsomytis and it starred Kariofyllia Karampeti, Tania Trypi, Minas Hatzisavvas, Giorgos Moschidis, Peggy Trikalioti, Nicola Farron, Afroditi Grigoriadou, Vassilis Diamantopoulos and others. The series won 11 Greek television awards and it is the most award-winning Greek TV series along with The Ten. The soundtrack of the series was written by Vassilis Dimitriou and it became success.

Plot
A traditional family in Crete during German occupation tries to hide an undesirable pregnancy. In the same time, the father dies from a disease and the oldest daughter takes over the family.

Cast
Kariofyllia Karampeti 
Tania Trypi
Minas Hatzisavvas
Giorgos Moschidis
Peggy Trikalioti
Nicola Farron
Afroditi Grigoriadou
Vassilis Diamantopoulos
Marina Psalti
Maria Kavoukidi

Awards
The series won 11 television awards in "Prosopa" Greek Television Awards:

References

External links

Hellenic Broadcasting Corporation original programming
Greek drama television series
1997 Greek television series debuts
1998 Greek television series endings
1990s Greek television series